South Hills Village is a station on Pittsburgh Regional Transit's light rail network. It is the southern terminus of both the Red and Blue lines. Port Authority's switching yard and shops are located just west of the station. The station is located in Bethel Park, PA and is adjacent to the South Hills Village shopping complex. A large 7 floor, 2200 space parking garage was completed in 2004 at a cost of $21.6 million ($ million in  adjusted for inflation) and is located on site for commuters traveling from Pittsburgh's South Hills suburbs. The station itself is located at the center-back (south side) of the first floor of the garage. In addition to serving as a commuter stop, the site also handles much reverse flow traffic of shoppers from the city and more northerly suburbs.

Bus connections
36 Banksville

See also
South Hills Village

References

Port Authority of Allegheny County stations
Railway stations in the United States opened in 1984
Blue Line (Pittsburgh)
Red Line (Pittsburgh)